Comet Holmes  (official designation: 17P/Holmes) is a periodic comet in the Solar System, discovered by the British amateur astronomer Edwin Holmes on November 6, 1892. Although normally a very faint object, Holmes became notable during its October 2007 return when it temporarily brightened by a factor of a million, in what was the largest known outburst by a comet, and became visible to the naked eye. It also briefly became the largest object in the Solar System, as its coma (the thin dissipating dust ball around the comet) expanded to a diameter greater than that of the Sun (although its mass remained minuscule).

Discovery 

Comet Holmes was discovered by Edwin Holmes on November 6, 1892, while he was conducting regular observations of the Andromeda Galaxy (M31).
Its discovery in 1892 was possible because of an increase in its magnitude similar to the 2007 outburst; it brightened to an approximate magnitude of 4 or 5 before fading from visibility over a period of several weeks.

The comet's discovery was confirmed by Edward Walter Maunder (Royal Observatory, Greenwich, England), William Henry Maw (Kensington, London, England), 
and B. Kidd (Bramley, Surrey, England).
Independent discoveries were made by Thomas David Anderson (Edinburgh, Scotland) on November 8 and by Mike Brown (Wilkes, USA) and by John Ewen Davidson (Mackay, Queensland, Australia) on November 9.

The first calculations of the elliptical orbit of 17P/Holmes were done independently by Heinrich Kreutz and George Mary Searle. Additional orbits eventually established the perihelion date as June 13 and the orbital period as 6.9 years. These calculations proved that the comet was not a return of Biela's Comet.

The 1899 and 1906 appearances were observed, but the comet was lost (see Lost comet) after 1906 until it was recovered on July 16, 1964, by Elizabeth Roemer (US Naval Observatory Flagstaff Station, Arizona, United States).  Aided by the computer predictions of Brian G. Marsden, the comet has been observed on every subsequent return.

2007 outburst 

During its 2007 return, Holmes unexpectedly brightened from a magnitude of about 17 to about 2.8 in a period of only 42 hours, making it visible to the naked eye. This represents a change of brightness by a factor of a million and is the largest known outburst by a comet thus far. The outburst took place from October 23 to 24, 2007. The first person reportedly to notice a change was J. A. Henríquez Santana on Tenerife in the Canary Islands; minutes later, Ramón Naves in Barcelona noticed the comet at magnitude 7.3. It became easily visible to the naked eye as a bright yellow "star" in Perseus, and by October 25 17P/Holmes appeared as the third-brightest "star" in that constellation.

Although large telescopes had already shown fine-scale cometary details, naked-eye observers saw Holmes as merely star-like until October 26. After that date, 17P/Holmes began to appear more comet-like to naked-eye observers. This is because during the comet's outburst, its orbit took it to near opposition with respect to Earth, and because comet tails point away from the Sun, Earth observers were looking nearly straight down along the tail of 17P/Holmes, making the comet appear as a bright sphere.

Holmes's nucleus is estimated at 3.4 km.

Comet Holmes not only became brighter, but its coma (nebulous envelope around the nucleus) expanded. In late October 2007 the coma's apparent diameter increased from 3.3 arcminutes to over 13 arcminutes, about half the diameter of the Moon in the sky. At a distance of around 2 AU, this means that the true diameter of the coma had swelled to over 1 million km, or about 70% of the diameter of the Sun.  By comparison, the Moon is 380,000 km from Earth.  Therefore, during the 2007 outburst of Comet Holmes the coma was a sphere wider than the diameter of the Moon's orbit around Earth.  In November 2007, the coma had dispersed to a volume larger than the Sun, briefly giving it the largest extended atmosphere in the Solar System.

The cause of the outburst is not definitely known. The huge cloud of gas and dust may have resulted from a collision with a meteoroid, or, more probably, from a build-up of gas inside the comet's nucleus that eventually broke through the surface. However, researchers at the Max Planck Institute suggest in a paper published in Astronomy and Astrophysics that the brightening can be explained by a thick, air-tight dust cover and the effects of H2O sublimation, with the comet's porous structure providing more surface area for sublimation, up to one order of magnitude greater. Energy from the Sun – insolation – was stored in the dust cover and the nucleus within the months before the outburst.

The comet remained visible in February 2008 though it had become a challenging target at about magnitude +5 in the constellation Perseus. It had expanded to greater than 2 degrees of arc as seen from Earth, and thus had very little surface brightness. Notably the comet 17P/Holmes dust trail from the 2007 outburst repeatedly converges at the original site. 

An outburst of 3–4 magnitudes occurred in January 2015, but still required a large telescope to be seen.

References

External links 

 17P at Cometary Science Center
 17P at Kronk’s Cometography
 17P at Kazuo Kinoshita's Comets
 17P at Seiichi Yoshida's Comet Catalog
 Magnitude graph for 2007-2009
 Enigmatic Comet Holmes by Jeff Bryant, The Wolfram Demonstrations Project.
 Evolution of Comet 17P/Holmes
 Obscure Comet Brightens Suddenly
 Quick Facts About Comet Holmes
 Simple Instructions on How to Find Comet Holmes Instructions for the Amateur-based around Toronto or New York.
 17P at Las Cumbres Observatory (22 Jan 2010 11:57, 223 seconds)
 Hubble Zooms In on Heart of Mystery Comet (Hubblesite STScI-2007-40 : November 1, 2007)
 NASA's Spitzer Gets Sneak Peek Inside Comet Holmes (October 13, 2008)

Periodic comets
0017
20071023
Comets in 2014
18921106